Lorenzo Fratellini (1690s-1729) was an Italian painter of the late-Baroque period. Also known as Lorenzo Maria Fratellini. Born in Florence, his mother Giovanna Fratellini was renowned for painting miniature portraits. Like his mother, he trained under Antonio Domenico Gabbiani. He specialized as a still life and vedute painter.

References

1690 births
1729 deaths
17th-century Italian painters
Italian male painters
18th-century Italian painters
Painters from Florence
Italian Baroque painters
Italian still life painters
18th-century Italian male artists